MSAA may refer to:

Science and technology
 Multisample anti-aliasing, a type of anti-aliasing
 Microsoft Active Accessibility, an application programming interface for user interface accessibility
 Multifunctional serotonin agonist and antagonist; See Flibanserin

Other uses
 Maharashtra State Angling Association, the controlling organisation of Powai Lake

See also
 Managed software as a service (MSaaS), in software as a service